Day of Solidarity with Poland – a special day declared by the Ronald Reagan administration as a day of support for the democratic opposition in Poland.

History
This day was set for January 30, 1982, as a response to the introduction of martial law in Poland on December 13, 1981.

On that day, demonstrations were held all over the world in defense of the outlawed Solidarity movement.

The next day, January 31, 1982, television stations in many countries, as well as the radio stations Voice of America, Radio Liberty, and Radio France Internationale broadcast a joint program entitled Let Poland be Poland.

References

Political history of Poland
1982 in politics
Anti-communism in Poland
Martial law
Solidarity (Polish trade union)